Albert Gallatin Brown (May 31, 1813June 12, 1880) was Governor of Mississippi from 1844 to 1848 and a Democratic United States Senator from Mississippi from 1854 to 1861, when he withdrew during secession.

Early life
He was born to Joseph and Elizabeth (Rice) Brown, a poor farming family, in the Chester District of South Carolina, at the foothills of the Appalachian Mountains in 1813. In 1823, when he was only 10 years old his family moved to the new state of Mississippi. The Brown family settled Copiah County, south of the state capital, Jackson. Raising cotton in the new frontier state proved to be lucrative for the Brown family. In 1824, just one year after settling in Mississippi, Joseph Brown was elected Justice of the Peace in Copiah County. By 1825, two years after arriving in Mississippi, he was the third-largest taxpayer in the county, owning 18 slaves. By 1832, he was farming a plantation of 1,600 acres and owned 23 slaves.

In 1829, Albert Brown entered Mississippi College, but he soon transferred to Jefferson College, which he attended for about six months.

Political career
During his lifetime, Brown was one of the most popular and the most influential men in Mississippi. He is considered to be the father of the public school system and of the University of Mississippi. His rhetorical attacks on illiteracy are considered to have made a substantial contribution to the cause of education in Mississippi.

He was also a Fire-Eater and a strong advocate for the expansion of slavery. In 1858, he said: "I want a foothold in Central America... because I want to plant slavery there.... I want Cuba,... Tamaulipas, Potosi, and one or two other Mexican States; and I want them all for the same reason - for the planting or spreading of slavery." Indeed, he went on to say, "I would spread the blessings of slavery, like the religion of our Divine Master, to the uttermost ends of the earth."

To those who agreed with such views, "Albert Gallatin Brown possessed magical powers.  With many learnt spells, handsome countenance surrounded by a luxuriant, flowing beard and dark-curly hair, in every sense he looked distinguished.  Courageous, he was void of vanity; animated, he was persuasive; his spirit, crackerish to the extreme." In his speech, Reuben Davis, who knew him well, states in his book Reminiscences on Mississippi and Mississippians that Brown "was the best-balanced man I ever knew.... In politics, he had strategy with-out corruption, and handled all his opponents with skill but never descended to intrigue."  During a lifetime, most of which was spent in an epoch of bitter controversy, his most intimate friends never heard him speak ill of others.

Brown served three terms in the state legislature, four in the US Congress, one on the circuit bench. He was twice elected United States senator, twice Governor, and one senator in the Confederate Congress. Rand wrote that "the political career of Albert Gallatin Brown provides one of the most amazing chapters in Mississippi history."

Death
Overcome by a stroke of apoplexy, Brown fell face down in a shallow pond at his home near Terry in 1880. His last remains rest in Greenwood Cemetery, Jackson.

Personal life
Brown's first wife was Elizabeth Frances Thornton Taliaferro (1817–1836) of Virginia, who died about five months after the marriage.  She was the daughter of Richard Henry Taliaferro, Sr. (1783–1830) and Frances Walker Gilmer (ca. 1784-1826).

Brown's second wife was Roberta Eugenia Young (1813–1886), daughter of Brig. Gen. Robert Young (1768–1824) and Elizabeth Mary Conrad (1772–1810). Roberta's older sister was Elizabeth Mary Young (1804–1859), the wife of Philip Richard Fendall II (1794–1867), the District Attorney of the District of Columbia.

Legacy
Brown was a slaveholder.
In Incidents in the Life of a Slave Girl, a narrative written by the escaped slave Harriet Jacobs, Brown is called out by Jacobs for supporting slavery in a speech to Congress despite the fact that he "could not be ignorant of [the wrongdoings perpetrated against slaves], for they are of frequent occurrence in every Southern State."

Brown County, Kansas, is named after him.

In popular culture
In the 1992 alternate history/science fiction novel The Guns of the South by Harry Turtledove, Brown is an important supporting character.

References

Sources

1813 births
1880 deaths
Democratic Party United States senators from Mississippi
Democratic Party governors of Mississippi
Jefferson College (Mississippi) alumni
Mississippi College alumni
People from Chester County, South Carolina
People of Mississippi in the American Civil War
Democratic Party members of the United States House of Representatives from Mississippi
19th-century American politicians
Activists from Mississippi
People from Terry, Mississippi
American proslavery activists
American white supremacists
American Fire-Eaters